The Mackunda Formation is a geological formation in Queensland, Australia whose strata date back to the Early Cretaceous. Dinosaur remains are among the fossils that have been recovered from the formation. It consists primarily of interbedded and cross bedded greensand, with variably calcareous shale, with local ferricrete.

Vertebrate paleofauna

See also 
 List of dinosaur-bearing rock formations

References 

Geologic formations of Australia
Cretaceous System of Australia
Early Cretaceous Australia
Albian Stage
Sandstone formations
Siltstone formations
Shale formations
Marl formations
Fossiliferous stratigraphic units of Oceania
Paleontology in Queensland